These were the rosters of the 10 teams competing at the 2015 FIBA Americas Championship.

Group A

Brazil

Dominican Republic

Mexico

}

Panama

Uruguay

Group B

Argentina

Canada

Cuba

Puerto Rico

Venezuela

External links
Official website

2015
squads